Sweta Verma (born 19 November 1996) is an Indian cricketer. In February 2021, Verma earned her maiden call-up to the India women's cricket team, for their limited overs matches against South Africa.

References

1996 births
Living people
Indian women cricketers
Place of birth missing (living people)